The 2003 Leicester City Council election took place on 1 May 2003 to elect members of Leicester City Council in England. This was on the same day as other local elections.

The whole council was up for election on new ward boundaries and the total number of seats was reduced from 56 to 54.

Summary

|}

References

Leicester
Leicester City Council elections
2000s in Leicestershire